Alan Johnson (born 13 March 1947) is an English former footballer who played on the right-wing for Port Vale and Stafford Rangers in the 1960s.

Career
Johnson graduated through the Port Vale youth side to sign professional forms at Vale Park in September 1964. He scored on his debut in a 2–2 draw with Barrow at Holker Street on 6 November 1965. However, he only played one more Fourth Division game in the 1965–66 season before being transferred to local non-league side Stafford Rangers by manager Jackie Mudie in November 1966.

Career statistics
Source:

References

Footballers from Stoke-on-Trent
English footballers
Association football wingers
Port Vale F.C. players
Stafford Rangers F.C. players
English Football League players
1947 births
Living people